The First Chifley ministry (Labor) was the 32nd ministry of the Government of Australia. It was led by the country's 16th Prime Minister, Ben Chifley. The First Chifley ministry succeeded the Forde ministry, which dissolved on 13 July 1945 following the election of Chifley as Labor leader after the death of former Prime Minister John Curtin. The ministry was replaced by the Second Chifley ministry on 1 November 1946 following the 1946 federal election.

Frank Forde, who died in 1983, was the last surviving member of the First Chifley ministry; Forde was also the last surviving minister of the Scullin government, the Curtin government, and the Forde government.

Ministry

Notes

Ministries of George VI
Chifley, 1
Australian Labor Party ministries
1945 establishments in Australia
1946 disestablishments in Australia
Cabinets established in 1945
Cabinets disestablished in 1946